The 2019 season was São Paulo's 90th year since the club's existence. Celebrating 9 decades of history, The Dearest has taken a place at a Campeonato Paulista finals after 16 years of tries, against the same rival of 2003 finals, Corinthians, but for the Tricolor Paulista a bad result happened again. São Paulo FC fatally fell in front of Corinthians in the last minute of second half in second match, by a result of 1–2 (Away) after 0–0 in Home. In other championships, São Paulo hadn't similar performance being prematurely eliminated in Copa do Brasil by Bahia by two losses and the painful defeat in the history of Copa Libertadores, in preliminary round by the Argentine club Talleres. Following an unsuccessful season, the only and last "hopeness" for the paulistas has turned into the national league, Série A. The Tricolor kept a regular position in the table between the 4th place and 8th place however constantly changing the head coaches (a very common practice by Brazilian clubs face of bad negative results in just a few matches). In overall were four managers, André Jardine, Vagner Mancini, Cuca and Fernando Diniz in the entire year of 2019. Finishing the performance of the season, the club has taken a place in the group stage of Copa Libertadores in 2020, keeping the dream of new international trophies in the next year.

Players

Current squad

Transfers

Transfers in

Transfers out

Competitions

Overview

Overall

{|class="wikitable"
|-
|Games played || 62 (18 Campeonato Paulista, 2 Copa do Brasil, 2 Copa Libertadores, 38  Campeonato Brasileiro, 2 Friendly match)
|-
|Games won || 23 (6 Campeonato Paulista, 0 Copa do Brasil, 0 Copa Libertadores, 17 Campeonato Brasileiro, 0 Friendly match)
|-
|Games drawn || 19 (6 Campeonato Paulista, 0 Copa do Brasil, 1 Copa Libertadores, 12 Campeonato Brasileiro, 0 Friendly match)
|-
|Games lost ||  20 (6 Campeonato Paulista, 2 Copa do Brasil, 1 Copa Libertadores, 9 Campeonato Brasileiro, 2 Friendly match)
|-
|Goals scored || 59
|-
|Goals conceded || 53
|-
|Goal difference || +6
|-
|Best result || 4–0 (H) v Chapecoense – Campeonato Brasileiro Série A – July 22, 2019
|-
|Worst result || 0–3 (A) v Palmeiras – Campeonato Brasileiro Série A – October 30, 20190–3 (A) v Grêmio – Campeonato Brasileiro Série A – December 1, 2019
|-
|Top scorer || Pablo (7 goals)
|-

Goalscorers 
In italic players who left the team in mid-season.

Managers performance

Friendlies

Florida Cup

Competitions

Campeonato Paulista

Group D

First stage 
São Paulo was drawn on the Group D.

Knockout stage

Quarterfinal

Semifinal

Final

Record

Copa Libertadores

Second stage

Record

Campeonato Brasileiro Série A

Results summary

Results by round

Record

Copa do Brasil 

The draw was held on May 2, 2019.

Record

References

External links
 official website

São Paulo FC seasons
Sao Paulo F.C.